Soledad is a municipality in the Colombian department of Atlántico, part of the Metropolitan area of Barranquilla. It is 6th in population in Colombia and 3rd in the Caribbean region, after Barranquilla and Cartagena. It is also the city with the highest population growth in Colombia and in 2005 was 455,734 and 2019 683,486. On October 25, 2015 Joao Herrera Iranzo was elected by popular vote as the new mayor of Soledad.

Limitations 
Bordered on the north by the special district of Barranquilla, where the boundary is the Arroyo Don Juan, on the south by Malambo, on the east with the Department of Magdalena, separated by the Magdalena River, and on the west by Galapa.

Geography 
Physical Description:
The location of the municipality of Soledad in relation to geographical coordinates is as follows: 10°55'N and 74°46'W.

Transportation

Ernesto Cortissoz International Airport

References

 Gobernacion del Atlantico - Soledad

Municipalities of Atlántico Department